Pierre Mertens (born 9 October 1939) is a Belgian French-speaking writer and lawyer who specializes in international law, director of the Centre de sociologie de la littérature at the Université Libre de Bruxelles, and literary critic with the newspaper Le Soir.

Influenced by Franz Kafka, Mertens started to publish novels and short stories in 1969 and received the Prix Médicis in 1987 for Les éblouissements. He nevertheless continued his activities as a lawyer, participating in many battles for human rights. In 1989, he entered the Académie royale de langue et littérature de Belgique, and was also named Chevalier de l'Ordre des Arts et des Lettres by France.

Mertens has reflected much on the social function of the writer. For him, private life, fiction, and history are inseparable. Thus he grants a central place to the memory in the creation of his works.  To him the novelist finds his inspiration in their personal and the historical past. Mertens is particularly marked by the activities of his parents, his father a journalist and music lover and his mother a biologist and pianist.  He was also much affected by the German occupation, the execution of the Rosenbergs or the tragedy of the miners of Marcinelle in 1956. Later as a scholar of international law he strongly denounces the genocide in Biafra, torture in Ireland, and the prisons of Pinochet.

Another important inspiration is music. In his novels, one finds the influence of music, such as the leitmotifs which cross them (the figure of the tiger, for example). He is also the author of a booklet on opera, La passion de Gilles (1982).

His many travels and his extensive education has given him an international perspective. In Les Bons offices (1974) and Terre d'asile (1978), for example, Belgian history is presented from a foreign perspective. Mertens often sees his country as a synthesis of Europe and its problems.

He caused a major controversy in his homeland with his book Une paix royale, published in 1995, which tells a fictionalised story of Belgium's royal family, mixing fiction and reality. He was tried and forced to remove a couple of pages from the subsequent editions.

Works

L'Inde ou l'Amérique – 1969
Le Niveau de la mer – 1970
L'Imprescriptibilité des crimes de guerre et contre *l'humanité – 1974
Les Bons offices – 1974
Terre d'asile – 1978
Nécrologies – 1979
La Fête des anciens – 1983
Terreurs – 1983
Perdre – 1984
Berlin – 1986
Les éblouissements – 1987
Uwe Johnson, le scripteur de murs – 1989
L'Agent double – 1989
Lettres clandestines – 1990
Les Chutes centrales – 1990
Les Phoques de San Francisco – 1991
Flammes – 1993
Une paix royale – 1995
Collision et autres nouvelles – 1995
Tout est feu – 1999
Perasma – 2001

External links
 Pierre Mertens at ARLFFB 

1939 births
Belgian writers in French
Belgian Marxists
Living people
Prix Médicis winners
People from Watermael-Boitsfort